is a type of ornamental finial used on Japanese railings. Gibōshi bridge ornaments resemble an onion; the ends are bulbous and typically come to a point. It is believed that the shape of gibōshi was from hōju ("sacred gem" or "cintāmaṇi") which is used to decorate roofs. They are often found on bridges in Japanese gardens, temples and shinto shrines.

Gibōshi come in two styles; normal style and Kamakura style.

See also 
 Japanese architecture
 Glossary of Shinto

References

Shinto architecture
Japanese architectural features
Japanese architectural history
Ornaments